Leross  or  is a village in the Canadian province of Saskatchewan within the Rural Municipality of Kellross No. 247 and Census Division No. 10.

History 
Leross incorporated as a village on December 1, 1909.

Demographics 

Attractions

The Kellross Heritage Museum (1962–3) is a municipal heritage property on the Canadian Register of Historic Places, located within the village of Leross.

See also 

 List of communities in Saskatchewan
 Villages of Saskatchewan

References

Villages in Saskatchewan
Rural Municipality of Kellross No. 247
Division No. 10, Saskatchewan